This list of newspapers in Grenada shows known current and historic newspapers that have been published in the southern Caribbean country of Grenada.  There have been newspapers in Grenada since 1798.

Current newspapers
 The Barnacle News – monthly
 The Grenada Informer – weekly - "The fearless weekly that tells it like it is." - established 1985. Published by Moving Target Company Limited.
 The Grenadian Voice – weekly - "The right alone is right, the wrong is always wrong."
 The New Today – weekly - "The pen is always mightier."
 NOW Grenada – online

Newspapers that have ceased publication
The following newspapers, once published in Grenada, have ceased publication: 
Caribbean Monthly Bulletin (19661975)
Chronicle and Gazette (19121915), 
The Citizen’s Weekly (from 1959 to 1961), 
The Corn (1975)
Daily Tidings (from 1886 to 1886), 
The Equilibrium (from 1882 to 1887), 
Excelsior! (from 1876 to 1876)
The Federalist (from 1896 to 1901), 
The Federalist and Grenada People, circa 1901–1920, 
The Forum (and Cribou in 1971), (19701972)
The Grapevine circa 1963
The Grenada Free Press and Public Gazette (18391840),
The Grenada Guardian (from 1930 to 1935), 
The Grenada Newsletter (August 17, 1973 - 1975)
The Grenada People (from 1883 to 1908), 
The Grenada Phoenix (1864-1865), 
The Grenada Reporter (from 1867 to 1867), 
Grenadian Voice was a newspaper in St. George, Grenada
Horizon
The J.E.W.E.L. (19721973)
The Negro World (existed in 1919)
The New Jewel (19731979)
New Dimensions (circa July 1974)
The New Era (from 1878 to 1880), 
The Road (1974)
St. George's Chronicle and Grenada Gazette (17981857), St. George's, Grenada, Weekly, 
The Star (from 1962 to 1962), 
The Weekly Record (from 1865 to 1865), 
This Was the Week That Was (May 13–20, 1973)
The Torchlight (19551975), 
Vanguard (1964-1973)
The West Indian, (1915-1975),

References

Communications in Grenada
Grenada